Ivanov is a 2010 Russian drama film directed by Vadim Dubrovitsky.

Plot 
The film tells about a man who brings one negative to the world and cannot find harmony.

Cast 
 Anna Dubrovskaya as Anna Petrovna Ivanova
 Vladimir Ilyin as Mikhail Mihaylovich Borkin
 Yuri Kalinnikov
 Eduard Martsevich as Matvey Semenovich Shabelskiy
 Aleksey Serebryakov as Nikolay Alekseevich Ivanov
 Bogdan Stupka as Pavel Kirillyich Lebedev

References

External links 
 

2010 films
2010s Russian-language films
Russian drama films
2010 drama films